Cornelius Steenwyck (born Cornelis Jacobsz Steenwijck; March 16, 1626 – November 21, 1684) served two terms as Mayor of New York City, the first from 1668 to 1672 (or 1670, and the second from 1682 to 1684 (or 1683).

Other spellings of his name include Cornelis Steenwijck, Cornelius Steenwyk, and Van Steenwyk.

He also briefly served as governor of the Dutch West India Company's paper claim over New Holland (Acadia) in 1676, although his only attempt to actually assert Dutch control over the territory was rebuffed at Fort Pentagouet by three war ships from Boston. The Dutch colonial claim over Acadia was surrendered in 1678 by the Treaties of Nijmegen.

An inventory of his estate ordered July 20, 1686 ran 14 pages and totaled £4,382 (New York pounds), while a list of his debts ran 16 pages, and totaled £1,588, showing that Cornelis Steenwyck was one of the richest men in New York of his time.

Steenwick Avenue in The Bronx is named after him.

References

1626 births
1684 deaths
Mayors of New York City
American people of Dutch descent
17th-century Dutch colonial governors
Governors of Acadia
Politicians from Haarlem
People of New Netherland